Teo Spiller (born December 4, 1965, in Ljubljana) is a Slovenian digital artist who has been active in the net.art movement since 1995. Spiller is notable for being one of the first artists to sell a piece of Internet art to a museum or collector.  he was an assistant professor at Arthouse College in Ljubljana.

net.art Career

This made Spiller one of the first net.art artists to sell a piece to a gallery or collector. Sale negotiations between Spiller and the buyer were conducted through the use of an open online forum. His other notable net.art projects include Hommage to Mondrian, Nice Page, Caprices for Netscape   and Esmeralda.

In 2000 Spiller organized an international art event called INFOS 2000. This was an offline net.art contest addressing how new multimedia has contextually and aesthetically obscured the borders between net.art and CD-ROM art. He also produced many fine art works reflecting the aesthetics of new media.

In 2004 Spiller launched X-lam, a different media for viewing images, in collaboration with Tadej Komavec. It works best in low-light conditions. A 'stick' contains a series of blinking diodes; by moving the eyes quickly the viewer can briefly see an image floating in open space. Spiller exhibited X-lam at the 10th Cairo International Biennale, alongside other viewing technologies like stereograms and streaming textuality, which he later used in the installation Intruders (Kino Siska, 2012).

In 2007 Spiller declined to participate in the U3 Triennial of Contemporary Arts due to conflicting ideas concerning the presentation of net.art in a gallery.

In 2008 Spiller launched Real3Dfriend, a project that questions the ethics of virtual-reality worlds such as Second Life and critiques virtual-reality systems for being too commercial and lacking basis in humanist values.

In 2011 Spiller launched projects in new media textuality and new media semiotics, which combined the artist's writing with net.art projects like SPAM sonnet and news sonnets.

Combining visual media and machinery, Spiller built the robot Laboro to explore the concept of cyborg artistry (a combination of human and machinery within the artistic process). This resulted in "Wooden In/Form/Ations"  and robot-generated graphics such as President Obama following the execution of Osama bin Laden.

Solo exhibitions

 Galerija Commerce, Ljubljana, Slovenia
 Klub Cankarjev dom, Ljubljana, Slovenia
 Gallery Rael Artel, Pärnu, Estonia
 INFOS 2000 (off-line) net.art contest
 Installation "Inside the web server", Hevreka!05, Ljubljana, Slovenia, 2005
 "Sshh!", KUD France Prešeren, Ljubljana, Slovenia, 2010 
 "Wooden In/form/Ation", Trubar Literature House, Ljubljana, Slovenia, 2011
 "LIFE", Merlin Theatre, Budapest, Hungary, 2011
 "Intruders", Kino Šiška, Ljubljana, Slovenia, 2012

Group exhibitions

 film+arc, Graz; Austria, 1997
 Ostranenie 97, Dessau, Germany, 1997
 Digital Graphic Art on Paper, Ljubljana Municipal Museum, 1999
 Masters of Graphic Arts, Győr, Hungary, 2001
 Break 2.3, Ljubljana, Slovenia, 2005
 Territories, Identities, Nets, Museum of Modern Art, Ljubljana, Slovenia, 2005
 Device-art 2006, Kontejner Zagreb/Blasthaus San Francisco, 2006, Croatia/US
 10th Cairo International Biennale, Cairo, Egypt, 2006/2007
 Kiparstvo danes, Celje, Slovenia, 2010
 Interruption - 30th Ljubljana Biennial of Graphic art, Ljubljana, 2013

References

External links
 Official website
 Videos about his work
 Gallery of his work
 Artist Career His lectures about being a contemporary artist
 Megatronix
 Mestna galerija Ljubljana

Net.artists
Artists from Ljubljana
New media artists
Digital artists
Living people
1965 births